DXGO (855 AM) Aksyon Radyo is a radio station owned and operated by Manila Broadcasting Company through its licensee Pacific Broadcasting System. The station's studio is located inside the MBC Compound, R. Castillo Ave. cor. Gov. Vicente Duterte, Agdao, Davao City, and its transmitter is located along Broadcast Ave., Shrine Hills, Matina, Davao City.

References

Radio stations established in 1997
Radio stations in Davao City
Pacific Broadcasting Systems stations